The Kingston Interchange is a hybrid four way interchange incorporating a roundabout and elements of a trumpet interchange. It connects the Southern Outlet with the Huon Highway and the Channel Highway at Kingston, within the greater area of Hobart, Tasmania.

The Kingston Interchange has recently been upgraded to address safety problems associated with right-turn movements at the interchange. The interchange modifications included:
Replacement of the existing T junction of the Southern Outlet south bound off-ramp and the Huon Highway with a roundabout
Provide a new on-ramp for Kingston to Hobart Traffic
Provide a new on-ramp for Kingston to Margate Traffic

The Department of Infrastructure, Energy and Resources also upgraded the interchange with the intention of providing a dual-carriage highway south of the interchange some time in the future (see Kingston Bypass).

See also

References

Transport in Hobart
Road interchanges in Australia
Highways in Hobart
Roads in Tasmania